Awagarh is a historic town and a Municipality City in Etah district in the state of Uttar Pradesh, India. It is a tehsil of many colours and contrasts. Here stands a 108-acre pristine fort of Jadaun Rajputs rulers of the Kshatriya clan, who after migration from Karauli had built this magnificent fortress in the 12th century on a tiny mound, claiming the biggest moat encircling around it. The fort, surrounded by lush green fields, is an ideal destination for nature lovers and a perfect getaway from a chaotic city life.

Raja Balwant Singh Ji of Awagarh, built a college named after him as Raja Balwant Singh College at Agra. He donated hundreds of acres of land to the college. He also helped Rabindra Nath Tagore to set up Shantiniketan. This city ranked first in district in Swachh Bharat Mission (Sahari) 2019 and second in state.

Awagarh is the largest town after the district.

Culture

Tourist Places  

 Awagarh Fort
 Awagarh Fort Garden
 Jain Tempel's

Fairs , Festivals and Grand Procession 
 Ramlila
 Urs Mahotsav is very big fair in the city.
Annat Chaturdasi is second very big Grand Procession in the city.
Dev Chhat
Devi Pujan (Navratri)
Ram Barat is  big grand procession in the city . Thakuron ka mela
Hanuman Jayanti
Mahavir Jayanti 
Janmastami

Amenities
There are two police stations: Thana Kotwali, Kachpura and Mahila Thana, Main Chauraha. 

Awagarh city has been built around a market which is roughly 3 km in length. 

1 Main Market

2 Fort Road

3 Block Market

4  Yadav Nagar Market

5 Raj Market

6 Agra Road Market

7 Etah Road Market
 8 Kila Road Market

Transport

Road 
Bus and taxis are available to major cities of state and other parts of the country.

• Uttar Pradesh State Road Transport Corporation Bus Stand

Railway 

 Awagarh Railway Station

 Agra Cantonment
 Tundla Junction

See also 
 List of forts in Uttar Pradesh

References

Cities and towns in Etah district
Forts in Uttar Pradesh